Acratosaura is a genus of lizards in the family Gymnophthalmidae. The genus is endemic to Brazil.

Species
The genus Acratosaura contains 2 species which are recognized as being valid.
Acratosaura mentalis  – Amaral's colobosaura 
Acratosaura spinosa  – spiny colobosaura

Nota bene: A binomial authority in parentheses indicates that the species was originally described in a genus other than Acratosaura.

References

 
Taxa named by Miguel Trefaut Rodrigues
Taxa named by Kátia Cristina Machado Pellegrino
Taxa named by Marianna Dixo
Taxa named by Vanessa Kruth Verdade
Taxa named by Dante Pavan
Taxa named by Antônio Jorge Suzart Argôlo
Taxa named by Jack W. Sites Jr.